The Dawn 150 was an ARCA Menards Series race held at the Chicagoland Speedway in Joliet, Illinois. It was originally 201 miles until 2008, but was shortened to 150 miles the next year. It has supported NASCAR Truck Series Overton's 225 in 2009, 2010 and 2012 and since 2016 the NASCAR Cup Series Overton's 400. The race is notable for its parity, as there was never a repeat winner throughout the 19 races held at the track.

Past winners

 2008, 2017 and 2018: Race extended due to a Green–white–checker finish.
2020: Race cancelled and moved to Kansas due to the COVID-19 pandemic.

References

External links 
 Racing-Reference.info – Chicagoland Speedway

2001 establishments in Illinois
ARCA Menards Series races
Motorsport in Illinois
Recurring sporting events established in 2001
Sports in Joliet, Illinois
Recurring sporting events disestablished in 2020